Refuge is a 2012 American drama film written and directed by Jessica Goldberg, based on her play of the same name. It stars Krysten Ritter, Brian Geraghty, Logan Huffman, and Madeleine Martin.

Plot
After her parents disappear, Amy drops out of college to care for her two younger siblings. Sam, a man with whom Amy has had a one-night stand, requests to rent space at Amy's house, and a romance develops between the two.

Cast
 Krysten Ritter as Amy
 Brian Geraghty as Sam
 Logan Huffman as Nat
 Madeleine Martin as Lucy
 Juliet Garrett as Molly
 Chris Papavasiliou as Gary
 Joe Pallister as Steve

Production
Filming took place in Southampton, New York, in February 2011 and took about a month.

Release
Refuge premiered at the 2012 Hamptons International Film Festival.

Reception
, the film holds a 33% approval rating on Rotten Tomatoes, a review aggregator, based on nine reviews with an average score of 5.62/10. Metacritic rated it 34/100 based on six reviews. John DeFore of The Hollywood Reporter called it a "sincere but unconvincing drama" that suffers in the adaptation to film.  Neil Genzlinger of The New York Times called it "a fragmentary, unconvincing effort to trace the emergence of a familial bond".  Sheri Linden of the Los Angeles Times wrote, "Explained rather than inhabited, the characters are half-formed, and their low-grade depression infects the underpowered storytelling."

References

External links
 
 
 

2012 films
2012 drama films
2012 independent films
American drama films
American films based on plays
American independent films
Films about dysfunctional families
Films shot in New York (state)
2010s English-language films
2010s American films